The Indian Institute of Technology Jammu (IIT Jammu) is a public research university located in Jammu, Jammu and Kashmir, India. As one of India's Indian Institutes of Technology, the university came into existence in 2016 when a Memorandum of Understanding (MoU)  between Department of Higher Education, Government of Jammu and Kashmir and Department of Higher Education, Ministry of Human Resource Development (MHRD), Government of India, was signed. The IIT campus has been constructed in the village of Jagti, in Nagrota Tehsil, in Jammu district.

Campus

Temporary campus
Set up in the LCD campus, the temporary campus of IIT Jammu has all the facilities required for a hassle-free academic environment. A total of 40,000 sq.ft. built-up area including hostels, house classrooms, a seminar room, a library, a computer Laboratory, faculty offices, a cafeteria, and recreational and creative facilities. The campus has volleyball, basketball, badminton courts, and cricket nets. Indoor sports facilities include table tennis, carom, chess, and snooker. Rooms for music, dance, and other activities are also available.  There is a very nice open-air stage in the academic building which serves as the centre of cultural activities and performances.

Initially, the first batch of B.Tech. students stayed at the temporary campus for the first two years. They were subsequently transferred to the transit Campus once it was finished to stay with all the subsequent batches. The temporary campus now houses only the P.hD students and research scholars.

Permanent campus

The State Government has provided the land, measuring 159 hectare for establishment of Indian Institute of Technology at Jammu. The agreement was signed by Prof. V. Ramgopal Rao, Director IIT Delhi for and on behalf of MHRD, Government of India, being the mentor Institute and Shri Hemant Sharma, Secretary to Government, Higher Education Department Government of Jammu and Kashmir. IIT Jammu started functioning from 2016 itself from a Temporary campus within Jammu city. Construction of transit campus also started at the same time, and it was ready for operations within a year. The transit campus, spread over 25 acres within the site of the permanent campus, with built up area of about 2 lakh sq. ft. became operational from August, 2017, with the 2017-18 session commencing on permanent campus.  The hostels are well equipped for a comfortable lodging and boarding for 650 students. Now, it houses full strength of the B.Tech. as well as the M.Tech. students. 
The on-campus facilities include hostel accommodation for all students closer to academic area, cafeteria, open gym, laundry centers, digital classrooms, ubiquitous anytime WiFi, music room, TT tables, snooker table, dispensary, and a common hall with TV for indoor recreational activities. The campus has volleyball, basketball, badminton courts, cricket nets and a football ground is under construction. ICICI and J&K Bank have set up their ATMs alongside the hostels near cafeteria. The campus is well connected to Jammu city, and is located on National Highway 44 (India)(Srinagar - Kanyakumari Highway), 6-7  km. from the main Jammu City.

Academic profile
The academic programme at IIT Jammu followed the curriculum of Indian Institute of Technology Delhi (IIT Delhi) until 2018 entry B.Tech. batches. Batches admitted to B.Tech. programme in 2019 and onward follow IIT Jammu curriculum. The curriculum is designed considering the 'New Education Policy' of India. In the first year, the students are taught basic sciences and basic engineering. In addition, non-graded courses on language, professional ethics & social responsibility and introduction to engineering are also included. The institute follows a credit system and the performance in a course is continuously evaluated. A relative grading system is followed for first-year students and for rest of the years it solely depends on the institute academic and course coordinator. Institute has started using ERP from July 2018.

Programmes

The institute conducts educational programs leading to the degrees of Bachelor of Technology (B.Tech.), Master of Technology(M.Tech.) and Ph.D. in the following areas:

References

External links 
 
 
 
 
 

Jammu Division
Education in Jammu (city)
Engineering colleges in Jammu and Kashmir
Educational institutions established in 2016
2016 establishments in Jammu and Kashmir